The 2016–17 Northern Arizona Lumberjacks men's basketball team represented Northern Arizona University during the 2016–17 NCAA Division I men's basketball season. The Lumberjacks were led by fifth-year head coach Jack Murphy and played their home games at the Walkup Skydome in Flagstaff, Arizona as members of the Big Sky Conference. They finished the season 9–23, 6–12 in Big Sky play to finish in tenth place. As the no. 9 seed in the Big Sky tournament, the lost in the first round to Portland State.

Previous season
The Lumberjacks finished the 2015–16 season 5–25, 3–14 in Big Sky play to finish in a tie for 11th place. They lost in the first round of the Big Sky tournament to Eastern Washington.

Departures

2016 incoming recruits

Roster

Schedule and results

|-
!colspan=9 style=| Non-conference regular season

|-
!colspan=9 style=| Big Sky regular season

|-
!colspan=9 style=| Big Sky tournament

References

Northern Arizona Lumberjacks men's basketball seasons
Northern Arizona
Northern Arizona Lumberjacks men's basketball
Northern Arizona Lumberjacks men's basketball